Olivia Peralta is a Mexican television hostess, and entrepreneur.  She is known for her role as co-host of PICNIC, a talk show on Telehit, a channel owned by Televisa.  She is also co-founder of the Mundo Rosa website, a web-only magazine focusing on teenaged girls.

Professional career

Television 
Her breakout role came as co-hostess for the television show PICNIC, which she co-hosted for almost 9 years.   She is currently a judge on Discovery Home & Health's show Desafío Fashionista.

Modeling 
Olivia Peralta began modeling at age 16, and continues to model.

Writing 
Olivia is co-author of the best-selling book Mundo Rosa – Tu Guia Maxima De Belleza.

Mundo Rosa 
Olivia Peralta and Angie Taddei are co-founders of www.mundorosa.com.mx, a website that covers topics of interest to teenage girls and young women.  They have since expanded the brand to include a best-selling book, and now a yearly expo called Mundo Rosa, La Experiencia which is meant to demonstrate products and advice provided on the website.

Other Work

Infatuation 
Olivia Peralta founded a fashion line called Infatuation.

Educator 
Olivia Peralta is a co-founder of Colegio Real Bosque, a school focusing on new ways to teach young children.

Personal life 
Olivia Peralta's partner is Dubai based financier Justin Morgan-Cooper.  She is the mother to three girls, Gia, Luciana and Olivia.

Notable Relatives 
Olivia Peralta is daughter of Carlos Peralta, a prominent Mexican businessman.  Loreto Peralta, star of Instructions Not Included, is Olivia Peralta's niece.

References

External links 
 Home Page of Mundo Rosa
 
 Desafío Fashionista

Mexican television presenters
Mexican female models
Living people
Mexican women television presenters
1981 births